North Union Township is the name of some places in the U.S. state of Pennsylvania:
 North Union Township, Fayette County, Pennsylvania
 North Union Township, Schuylkill County, Pennsylvania

See also 
 East Union Township, Pennsylvania
 South Union Township, Pennsylvania
 Union Township, Pennsylvania (disambiguation)

Pennsylvania township disambiguation pages